The Nisipari is a small river in Constanța County, Romania. It discharges into the Danube–Black Sea Canal near the village Nisipari.

References

Rivers of Constanța County
Rivers of Romania